Sciurocheirus makandensis (Makandé squirrel galago) is a species of squirrel galago native to Gabon, Africa.

References 

Endemic fauna of Gabon
Primates of Africa
Mammals described in 2013
Galagos